Dzierzązna may refer to the following places:
Dzierzązna, Poddębice County in Łódź Voivodeship (central Poland)
Dzierzązna, Sieradz County in Łódź Voivodeship (central Poland)
Dzierzązna, Masovian Voivodeship (east-central Poland)